Day Watch (also Night Watch 2: The Chalk of Fate), is a 2006 Russian fantasy film written and directed by Timur Bekmambetov. Marketed as "the first film of the year", it opened in theatres across Russia on 1 January 2006, the United States on 1 June 2007, and the United Kingdom on 5 October 2007. It is a sequel to the 2004 film Night Watch, featuring the same cast. It is based on the second and the third part of Sergey Lukyanenko's novel The Night Watch rather than its follow-up novel Day Watch. The film's budget was US$4.2 million. 20th Century Fox through its Fox Searchlight Pictures label paid $2 million to acquire the worldwide distribution rights (excluding Russia and the Baltic states) of this film. This film grossed $31.9 million at the Russian box office alone. The film received mixed reviews from critics.

Plot

It is New Year's Day of 2006, more than a year after the events of Night Watch. Anton Gorodetsky, the protagonist of the first film, finds himself in the middle of an approaching conflict between the Light and Dark Others, who are still bound with an uneasy truce. Anton is still a Night Watch operative, now working with his trainee and romantic interest, Svetlana. As his son Yegor has now become a Dark Other, Anton is forced to secretly destroy evidence of Yegor's attacks on normal people, which violates the treaty, leaving the Night Watch unable to sentence Yegor.

To redeem for his previous mistake, an attempt to use a witch's service to kill the unborn Yegor (shown in the beginning of the first film), Anton seeks the legendary Chalk of Fate, a magical chalk that could rewrite history, which was once Tamerlane's property and one of the main reasons for his numerous military successes.

Meanwhile, Zavulon, the leader of the Dark Others and their Day Watch, is waiting for Yegor's birthday. At the birthday, Yegor would become a Great Other and acquire the power that would allow the Dark Others to break the treaty (which is only supported because the Others fear that the two sides will destroy each other). Zavulon's gratitude to Anton for covering Yegor's violations of the treaty doesn't stop him and the Day Watch from attempting to frame Anton for murder and bring him in front of the Inquisition. They succeed, despite the efforts made by Gesser, the head of the Night Watch, to protect Anton from the Dark Others by putting him in Olga's body. While in her body, Svetlana confesses that she loves Anton to the person she thinks is Olga, which pushes their relationship forward. This happens despite Svetlana's initial anger at Anton for not telling her that he was in Olga's body.

Anton obtains the Chalk of Fate from its hiding place in a Central Asian cafe in Moscow and uses it to summon Yegor. They initially get on well, but Yegor is resentful when Anton refuses his request to patch things up with Yegor's mother. Anton puts his large coat on Yegor, who seems to be cold, and leaves to order food. At this time, Svetlana rings Anton's mobile, which he left in the pocket of the coat, and Yegor, angry at her intrusion into his relationship with his absentee father, yells at her, "He has a family. Don't call again." He smashes the phone and leaves with the chalk, which he takes to Zavulon. Zavulon cannot use or touch the Chalk, because doing so would be a direct violation of the treaty, so he has Yegor give it to his minion/lover Alisia to do with as she wishes, although it is implied that Zavulon knows what she will do with it.

Yegor's birthday party begins soon after that; the guests are Dark Others (some of them are Russian pop stars), although Anton makes his way to the party as Yegor's father to expose the real perpetrator of the murder he has been charged with - his vampire neighbor, Kostya's father. He is unable, however, to avert a disaster: as Svetlana rushes to the party to find Anton, Yegor confronts her.  She tries to avoid a conflict but Yegor repeatedly challenges her and expresses resentment at her relationship with his father; Svetlana accidentally strikes Yegor and spills a drop of his blood, which Zavulon interprets as a violation of the Treaty and thus uses as a pretense to declare all-out war on the Light Others.

Yegor, now a Great Other, unleashes an apocalypse upon Moscow, killing most of the guests and blinding Svetlana. The city is nearly destroyed, starting with the Ostankino Tower; a fierce battle between the Light and Dark Others follows, with few survivors on either side. In the midst of the chaos, Anton, who survives, finds Alisia who is trying to revive her dead lover, Kostya, but without success. She cannot revive him because her actions did not cause his death. The scene implies the user of the Chalk can only change decisions that he or she made, not anyone else's. Anton convinces Alisia to give him the Chalk so that he can prevent the destruction of Moscow and the deaths of scores of Others, but is almost immediately caught by a panicked Svetlana and an enraged Yegor. The two Great Others fight for Anton, but nearly kill him in the process. Saved at the last minute by Gesser, Anton runs through the ruins of Moscow to the house where he, fourteen years ago, made his visit to the witch — the visit that caused the entire sequence of events, starting Anton's own initiation into the Night Watch. Anton writes NO (нет; pronounced nyet) on a wall in this house. Moscow reverts to its normal, undemolished state and the film returns to 1992 and the first scene of Night Watch.

In the epilogue, as a result of the Chalk's influence, Anton rethinks his deal with the witch, and therefore never inadvertently agrees to harm his wife's unborn child, who would have been Yegor. He walks out of the house and into the street, where he meets Svetlana. Zavulon and Gesser watch them from a park bench, eager to see if Anton will recognize Svetlana, despite now having never met her because of the rewriting of history. Gesser's prediction turns out to be accurate; despite not knowing how or why, Anton recognizes Svetlana and they walk off together, implicitly striking up a less harried relationship than the one they have/had in the first film.

Cast
 Konstantin Khabensky as Anton
 Mariya Poroshina as Svetlana
 Vladimir Menshov as Gesser
 Viktor Verzhbitsky as Zavulon
 Dmitriy Martynov as Yegor
 Galina Tyunina as Olga
 Zhanna Friske as Alisa
 Aleksei Chadov as Kostya
 Valeri Zolotukhin as Kostya's father
 Nurzhuman Ikhtymbayev as Zoar
 Aleksei Maklakov as Semyon
 Aleksandr Samojlenko as Bear
 Irina Yakovleva as Galina Rogova
 Gosha Kutsenko as Ignat
 Yegor Dronov as Tolik
 Emir Baigazin as young Tamerlane

Production
Roughly 20 visual effects vendors were utilized for the 800 shots using visual effects, compared to Night Watch'''s 400 effects; the main studio was the visual effects supervisor Vladimir Leschinski's Dr. Picture Studios. It took about a year to complete the visual effects.

ReceptionDay Watch received mixed to positive reviews, holding a 63% rating on Rotten Tomatoes based on 96 reviews, with an average score of 5.96/10; the consensus states: "Day Watch is frequently cheesy but it offers enough twists, surprises, and inventive action sequences to maintain viewer interest." On Metacritic, the film has a weighted average score of 59 out of 100, based on 21 critics, indicating "mixed or average reviews".

Leslie Felperin from Variety wrote that the sequel would satisfy fans of the original but also criticized its longer runtime.

Box office
According to Channel One Russia (producer of film), by January 4, 2006 about two million people in Russia and CIS had already watched the film. The release of the film across Russia was timed for the long holiday period (from 1–9 January) and created demand among the ticket-buying public unprecedented in the post-Soviet period. Gemini Film states that preliminary assessment for Day Watch'' box office by 25 June 2006 is $31,965,087. Day Watch was marketed as "the first film of the year", it was opened in theaters across Russia on January 1, 2006, in the United States on June 1, 2007 and the United Kingdom on October 5, 2007. The film's budget was 4.2 million dollars USD and the film grossed 31.9 million at the Russian box office.

Russian vs. North American releases

One of the key differences between the North American release and the Russian original is that while they both open with a particular sequence, the North American version is truncated.
 Anton and Anatoly play basketball in the computer room.
 Alisa visits Galina Rogova's little daughter to find out if she saw Gorodetsky.
 Anton calls his ex-wife (Yegor's mother) to find out where Yegor is.
 In the subway, Anton escapes from the pursuing Dark Others by jumping into a running train. The pursuers kill a night guard who tries to stop them.
 At the party Anton grabs a microphone from a singer and starts singing Communist songs.
 Yegor is trying to suck out the life force of Svetlana through the needle he put into her at the beginning.

In addition, there are many trims of existing scenes and excised lines. Also, there are some cuts for violence, e.g. Yegor pouring a pot of hot sausages over a vendor and Anton's brutal beating by the security guard.

The Unrated DVD is the same as the Russian release of the DVD.

See also
Vampire film

References

External links
 
 
 
 

Night Watch
2006 films
2006 fantasy films
2000s thriller films
Russian action films
Russian fantasy films
Russian horror thriller films
2000s Russian-language films
Films directed by Timur Bekmambetov
Films scored by Yuri Poteyenko
2000s action horror films
Films based on fantasy novels
Films based on Russian novels
Films set in Moscow
Films shot in Moscow
Supernatural thriller films
Vampires in film
Russian sequel films
Fox Searchlight Pictures films
Cultural depictions of Timur
Bazelevs Company films
Russian dark fantasy films